The Potteries Orienteering Club, often abbreviated to POTOC, is an Orienteering club  in the West Midlands  of the UK. It is for Orienteers in or around North Staffordshire and South Cheshire. The club is in the West Midlands Orienteering Association (WMOA)  and is a member of the BOF. The Club has been Clubmark accredited. The Club has a Newsletter Called 'The Potter'.

Structure
POTOC is run by a committee, which is elected at the AGM in October. It is governed by a formal constitution which states the official club name and affiliations and also the voting rights at the AGM.

Events
The Club Holds three types of events with varying frequency; 
Local Events, are held every month, these are suitable for beginners and often do not have the technical difficulty to host the harder courses that experienced orienteers require, but are fantastic for beginners with club coaches helping them.
 District Events, these are more formal and less frequent with courses for the more experienced as well as beginner.
Regional Events, these are held once a year and have very technically challenging courses and take the most planning.

Logo

The Main Club logo consists of a Bottle Oven with two Fir trees, this is used on Various Club items such as the Flag and Clothing. The club sells its own Sweatshirts and T-shirts these display the Official Club insignia. At Major events the Club uses its red tent and Flag.

Permanent Courses
The club has a number of permanent courses that have maps that can be freely downloaded and accessed from the club website.

 Apedale
 Bathpool Park
 Biddulph Grange
 Brough Park
 Downs Banks
 Ladderedge
 Hanley Forest Park

Awards and Trophies

The Club awards a series of trophies that are bestowed at the Christmas Social. There are Senior and Junior male and female trophies, a Novice trophy, and a Wooden spoon and bowl award for the biggest mistake of the season.

References

External links
 POTOC Club Website
POTOC Facebook Page
POTOC Twitter Page

Orienteering clubs in the United Kingdom
Sport in Staffordshire